The 2000–01 Edmonton Oilers season was the Oilers' 22nd season in the NHL. They were coming off a 32–26–16–8 record in 1999–2000 earning 88 points, their highest point total since 1989–90. They made the playoffs for the fifth-straight season. The Oilers would lose to the Dallas Stars in six games in the first round, the fifth consecutive season the two teams met in the playoffs and their fourth consecutive elimination at the hands of the Stars.

Off-season
During the off-season, general manager Glen Sather announced he was leaving the club to become the general manager of the New York Rangers. Sather had been the Oilers general manager since the 1980–81 season and helped build the teams dynasty of the 1980s, when Edmonton won 5 Stanley Cups in 7 years. Edmonton replaced Sather with Kevin Lowe, who was the team's head coach in 1999–2000, and they named former Oilers player Craig MacTavish as the head coach of the team.

Regular season
Early in the season, the Oilers traded Bill Guerin to the Boston Bruins in exchange for Anson Carter and the Bruins' first two rounds of draft picks in 2001. Guerin had earned 22 points in 21 games with Edmonton at the time, though Carter immediately provided solid scoring for the Oilers, earning 42 points in 61 games.

The highlight of the Oilers season was a nine-game winning streak in mid-February, which helped ensure the team make the playoffs for the fifth-straight season. Edmonton finished the year with 39 wins and 93 points, their highest totals since the 1987–88 season.  They finished in the sixth spot in the Western Conference.

Offensively, Doug Weight led the club with 90 points, scoring 25 goals and adding 65 assists. Ryan Smyth scored a team-high 31 goals and added 39 assists to finish the year with 70 points. Janne Niinimaa led the defense with 12 goals and 46 points, while fellow blueliner Tom Poti also scored 12 goals, finishing with 32 points. Georges Laraque led the Oilers in penalty minutes with 148.

In goal, Tommy Salo got the majority of action, winning a career-high 36 games, along with a 2.46 goals against average (GAA) and earning eight shutouts.

The Oilers opened the playoffs against the Dallas Stars, making it the fifth-straight year that the two clubs would face each other, including the third-straight time in the first round. The teams split the first two games in Dallas, and then split the two games in Edmonton, with both games in Edmonton being decided in overtime. Game 5 also went into overtime, with Dallas winning the game 4–3, and taking a 3–2 series lead. Game 6 returned to Edmonton, and the Stars held off the Oilers and won the game 3–1 and the series 4–2, eliminating the Oilers for the fourth-straight season.

Season standings

Schedule and results

Playoffs

Player statistics

Regular season
Scoring leaders

Goaltending

Playoffs
Scoring leaders

Goaltending

Awards and records

Awards

Milestones

Transactions

Trades

Free agents

Draft picks
Edmonton's draft picks at the 2000 NHL Entry Draft

References
 SHRP Sports
 The Internet Hockey Database
 National Hockey League Guide & Record Book 2007
Notes

Edmonton Oilers season, 2000-01
Edmon
Edmonton Oilers seasons